Kingsbury is an unincorporated community in Meigs County, in the U.S. state of Ohio.

History
A post office called Kingsbury was established in 1866, and remained in operation until 1911. The community was named for one Mr. Kingsbury, a pioneer settler.

References

Unincorporated communities in Meigs County, Ohio
Unincorporated communities in Ohio